The Minister of the Navy of the Netherlands was the minister responsible for the Ministry of the Navy and the Royal Netherlands Navy. Created in 1855, the position was abolished with the creation of the position of Minister of Defence in 1928, then reestablished in 1941 upon the abolition of the Ministry of Defence. When the Ministry of Defence was reestablished in 1948, the position of Minister of the Navy again was abolished.

The first Minister of the Navy was Abraham Johannes de Smit van den Broecke, while the last one was Alexander Fiévez, a member of the Catholic People's Party.

List of officeholders

See also
 List of Ministers of Defence of the Netherlands
 Minister of War

References

Military of the Netherlands
Navy